Charles Dennington (born 7 October 1899, died 1943) was an English professional footballer who played as a goalkeeper.

Career
Born in Beccles, Dennington played for Norwich City, Bradford City and Kirkley. He joined Norwich from his home town club, Beccles Town, and made his debut in a 1–1 draw against Queens Park Rangers in the Third Division (South) in August 1922, establishing himself as the Canaries' first choice ahead of William O'Hagen and Ernest Williamson. He missed just twenty League games over the next five seasons and became the first goalkeeper to play one hundred League matches for the club. After playing in Norwich's 5–2 home win against Watford on 2 May 1929, he was immediately transfer-listed for 'intemperate habits'. He played once more, in a 2–2 draw against Newport County, before being sold to Bradford City for £500, ten days later. There, he made 18 Football League appearances, before signing for non-league Kirkley, and then returning to Beccles. He played in the Suffolk Senior Cup Final with Kirkley in 1935, losing 3–1 to Newmarket Town, before finishing his career at Gorleston.

Sources
Davage, Mike (2002). Canary Citizens. Jarrold Publishing. .

References

1899 births
Year of death missing
English footballers
Norwich City F.C. players
Bradford City A.F.C. players
Kirkley & Pakefield F.C. players
English Football League players
Association football goalkeepers